Héctor Ortiz (2 April 1961—27 July 2010) was a Mexican professional tennis player.

Born in Mexico City, Ortiz attended La Jolla High School in the late 1970s, before playing collegiate tennis for Pepperdine University. On the professional tour he reached a career high singles ranking of 269, played in qualifiers at Wimbledon and made the main draw of the 1987 Guarujá Open. He won one ATP Challenger tournament as a doubles player.

Ortiz died of a heart attack in 2010 while playing tennis at the Reforma Athletic Club in Naucalpan, Mexico.

Challenger titles

Doubles: (1)

References

External links
 
 

1961 births
2010 deaths
Mexican male tennis players
Pepperdine Waves men's tennis players
Tennis players from Mexico City